Berta Dovidova (20 December 1922, Yazyavan – 1 August 2007, Tashkent) was an Uzbek and Soviet singer and music teacher, People's Artist of the Uzbek SSR (1964). She is best known as the first female performer of maqams, the traditional musical style of Central Asia.

Life 
Berta Dovidova was born on 20 December 1922 in Yazyavan, Uzbek SSR. Her family belonged to Bukharan Jews. When Dovidova was 11 or 12 years old her father died and the family moved to Tashkent to live with her uncle, the mother's brother.

When Dovidova graduated from the 4th grade of school, she was admitted to the Medical College named after Y. Akhunbabayev, and after graduating in 1938 worked until 1941 as a nurse in the old town polyclinic. With the outbreak of the World War II she worked in Tashkent military hospital for three years.

In 1943, an ensemble led by Yunus Rajabi visited the hospital where Dovidova worked, and after hearing Dovidova singing invited her to work at Tashkent Radio. Davidova joined the choir under the Uzbek Radio and Television Committee in 1943 and has been a member of the Uzbek ensemble since 1945.

Career 
In 1958, the Maqam ensemble under the State Committee on Television and Radion Broadcasting of Uzbekistan under the leadership of Yunus Rajabi was created. Dovidova has been a leading singer in the Maqam ensemble of the State Committee for Radio and Television since 1960.

Dovidova was the first female performed of maqams, the traditional music style of Central Asia.

In 1964, Dovidova was awarded a title of People's Artist of Uzbek SSR.

Dovidova's repertoire consisted of maqams and classical songs: “Munojot”, “Bayot II”, “Bayot V”, “Nasri bayot”, “Talkini bayot”, “Taronai bayot”, “Samarkand ushshoghi”, “Figon”, “Dugoh”, “Khayolim senda”, classical and modern songs such as "Yor Armugoni", "Dilnavozim", "Gulistonim mening", "Bakht", "Kuylagaiman", "Yodimdasiz". Her songs were included to the “Golden Fund” of Uzbek radio.

In 1975, a TV film “Munojot” (“A prayer”) was shot about Davidova.

In 1999, she was awarded Uzbek State Order of El-Yurt (Honor of Country).

Berta Dovidova died on 1 August 2007 in Tashkent.

In 2013, a Dovidova commemoration meeting took place at the Center for National Arts in Tashkent organized by the Fund Forum and the State Conservatory.

Personal life 
In 1948, Dovidova married a military doctor Rakhim Makhmudov, however they broke up soon, and she was raising their son alone.

References

1922 births
2007 deaths
20th-century Uzbekistani women singers
People's Artists of Uzbekistan
Soviet women singers